Esmat Dowlatshahi (1905 – 25 July 1995) was an Iranian royal and the fourth and last wife of Reza Shah.

Early life
Dowlatshahi was born in 1905. She was a member of the Qajar dynasty. Her father was Gholam Ali Mirza "Mojalal Dowleh" Dowlatshahi (1878–1934). Her mother was Mobtahedj-od-Dowleh, daughter of Ebtehadj Saltaneh and Abou Nasr Mirza Hessam Saltaneh II. Her paternal grandfather was Hessam-Saltaneh I. She had two brothers and one sister, Ashraf Saltaneh II. Mehrangiz Dowlatshahi, member of the Majlis and Iranian ambassador, was her cousin.

Marriage

Dowlatshahi and Reza Shah wed in 1923. She was his fourth, last and favourite wife. Reza Shah was the minister of war when they married. From this marriage five children were born: Abdul Reza, Ahmad Reza, Mahmoud Reza, Fatemeh and Hamid Reza Pahlavi. Her husband became Shah of Iran in 1925. However, it was her husband's second wife Tadj ol-Molouk who was given a public role as queen. This situation did not make Tadj ol-Molouk happy due to her jealousy of Dowlatshahi which she disclosed in her memoirs. 

Dowlatshahi and Reza Shah lived in the Marble Palace in Tehran with their children. She accompanied her husband to Mauritius when he was exiled there in September 1941, but she returned to Iran after a few months.

Later life and death

Dowlatshahi stayed in Iran after the 1979 Islamic Revolution. She visited the Museum of Reza Shah Pahlavi in Johannesburg, South Africa, in 1980. She died on 25 July 1995. She was buried in the Behesht-e Zahra cemetery, Tehran.

References

External links

20th-century Iranian women
1905 births
1995 deaths
Burials at Behesht-e Zahra
Qajar princesses
Spouses of prime ministers of Iran
Wives of Reza Shah